Jenessa Grant is a Canadian actress. She has played the characters Mud in Orphan Black, Ofsamuel in The Handmaid's Tale and Aylee in Reign. She also portrays Faith Seed in the video game Far Cry 5.

Selected filmography

Television

Video games

References

External links 

Place of birth missing (living people)
Year of birth missing (living people)
Canadian film actresses
Canadian television actresses
Living people
Canadian voice actresses
21st-century Canadian actresses